Shoesmith Glacier is the largest glacier on Horseshoe Island, flowing westward into both Lystad Bay and Gaul Cove. Named by United Kingdom Antarctic Place-Names Committee (UK-APC) in 1958 in association with Horseshoe Island.

Bordering the north side of the glacier is the Spincloud Heights.

See also
Trifid Peak

References

Glaciers of Fallières Coast